The Yermolova Theatre  is a theatre company in the Tverskoy District of central Moscow. It is under the artistic direction of Vladimir Andreyev.

The theatre's building was built in the 1830s, and is one of the largest on Tverskaya Street.  Tickets for productions cost about 50-300 roubles.

History
The theatre company was founded by graduates of the Maly Theatre studio in 1925, and named after the great Russian actress Maria Yermolova, with her blessing. It started out like most theatres did back then: as a school at first, then a travelling company and eventually became a stationary company. It was one of Moscow's most popular dramatic theatres from 1940 to 1960.

References

External links

—Official Yermolova Theatre website

Theatre companies in Russia
Theatres in Moscow
Tverskoy District
Culture in Moscow
Cultural heritage monuments of regional significance in Moscow